The Sistema Interconectado del Norte Grande (Spanish for Interconnected System of Norte Grande) or SING is an alternating current power grid serving the Norte Grande zone of Chile, it produces 19% of the national power generation. The SING covers the three northernmost regions of Chile including Arica y Parinacota, Tarapacá and Antofagasta Region. 

As of December, 2011, it had a total installed capacity of 4,550 MW (gross)

References

External links

 Global Energy Network Institute
 Centro de Despacho Económico de Carga del Sistema Interconectado del Norte Grande (CDEC-SING) - Economic Load Dispatch Center of the Big North Interconnected System

Norte Grande
Electric power transmission systems in Chile